Juan Antonio Chesa Camacho (born 1 February 1970 in Alicante, Valencian Community) is a Spanish retired footballer who played as a midfielder.

External links

1970 births
Living people
Footballers from Alicante
Spanish footballers
Association football midfielders
La Liga players
Segunda División players
Segunda División B players
Tercera División players
Villarreal CF players
Albacete Balompié players
CD Málaga footballers
Rayo Vallecano players
Écija Balompié players
Novelda CF players
Caravaca CF players
Spain under-23 international footballers